Wow Play TV is a record label and Film production company from Bangladesh. Wow Play TV produces  dramas, television films, movies, and music video, short films, showbiz news, telefilm, fiction, advertisement, and documentary. The owner of the company is Eshan Haider.

History 
Wow Play TV was established in 2019 by Eshan Haider by releasing a music video based on cricket world cup. After that they released Bengali Drama Khato Jamai which got huge popularity in Bangladesh drama industry. In 2021 during Eid al-Adha they released drama Crisis (2021 drama) which was praised by audiences and got huge popularity on various Social Media.

Artists

Musicians 

 Runa Laila
 Nazmun Munira Nancy
 S.I. Tutul
 Imran Mahmudul
 Mila Islam
 Hasanur Rahman
 Eshan Haider
 Alvee
 Bablu Kabir
 Eshan Haider
 Mohidul Tamim
 Raihan Abdullah

Actors 

 Arifin Shuvoo
 Parveen Sultana Diti
 Zara Zoya
 Idris Haider
 Pran Roy
 Imtu Ratish
 Hasan Masood
 Masum Aziz
 Maznun Mizan
 Ahona Rahman
 Shabnam Parvin
 Shahidul Alam Sachchu

Notable Drama 
* Omanush
 Tarchera
 Munia
 Ultrasnography
 Khato Jamai 
 Crisis (2021 Drama)
 Tara Vondo
 Mia Bari
 Ma Baba
 Khadok Family
 Oshikkhito Bou
 Khato Jamai 2

References

External links 

 Official Site
 Official Facebook Page

Bangladeshi record labels
Record labels established in 2019
2019 establishments in Bangladesh
Entertainment companies established in 2019
Record label distributors